Ricky Music is the fourth studio album by American band Porches. It was released on March 13, 2020 under Domino Records.

Critical reception
Ricky Music was met with generally favorable reviews from critics. At Metacritic, which assigns a weighted average rating out of 100 to reviews from mainstream publications, this release received an average score of 69, based on 10 reviews.

Track listing

References

2020 albums
Porches (band) albums
Domino Recording Company albums